Ian Leslie Hore-Lacy (1940 – 2 December 2021) was an Australian nuclear industry communicator, author and advocate for nuclear power in Australia. He semi-retired as Senior Advisor with the World Nuclear Association, London.

Career 
He was a Senior Advisor at the London-based World Nuclear Association, where he was previously Director of Public Information and Senior Research Analyst for over 16 years. Hore-Lacy had a Bachelor of Science with honours from the University of New England and a Master of Science from University of Melbourne, both in biological sciences.

Rio Tinto group 
His career in resources and energy began in 1974 when he was employed by CRA (now Rio Tinto Group) as an environmental scientist. He took a particular interest in uranium mining and nuclear energy during the Ranger inquiry in the 1970s. Hore-Lacy continued to work for CRA until 1993, ultimately working in Corporate Relations. Hore-Lacy was closely involved with the production of the TV documentary series Out of the Fiery Furnace which was completed for ABC television in Australia in 1985 and was supported by the Rio Tinto group (via CRA Services Ltd). The series traced the discovery and use of metals, minerals, and energy resources through time, and premiered in the US in 1986 and was shown in over twenty countries.

Nuclear industry 

In 1995 Hore-Lacy assumed the role of General Manager of the Uranium Information Centre in Melbourne, a position he held until 2001 publishing information on nuclear power to support the UIC members, all uranium miners and explorers. He also served as the organisation's secretary. The Centre's website was established in the year of his appointment. From 2001 his role progressively transferred to the World Nuclear Association, an international trade association, based in London. He was successively Director for Public Communications and Senior Research Analyst before largely retiring in 2017 as Senior Advisor.

During the Howard Government, Hore-Lacy was appointed to the Uranium Industry Framework, whose recommendations informed subsequent government policy announced in 2007. The announcements included plans to repeal prohibitions which prevented further nuclear industrial development in Australia under the EPBC Act.

Bibliography 
Hore-Lacy wrote, edited and co-authored several books; most recently Responsible Dominion – a  Christian Approach to Sustainable Development (2006) and Nuclear Energy in the 21st Century (2018). The latter book has been republished ten times and the 10th edition had a Chinese version.

Death and legacy 
Ian Hore-Lacy was killed in an accident while on holiday on 2 December 2021. His legacy includes his many publications and his curated library of academic papers and educational materials held at the World Nuclear Association.

References 

1940 births
2021 deaths
Australian non-fiction writers
University of New England (Australia) alumni
University of Melbourne alumni
Uranium mining in Australia
People of Rio Tinto (corporation)
Nuclear power in Australia